National Highway 105, commonly referred to as NH 105, is a national highway in India running from Pinjore in Haryana  to Swarghat in Himachal Pradesh. The highway passes through the states of Himachal Pradesh and Haryana.

References

National highways in India
National Highways in Himachal Pradesh
National Highways in Haryana